The 2009–10 Atlanta Hawks season was the 61st season of the franchise in the National Basketball Association (NBA). In the playoffs, the team defeated the Milwaukee Bucks in seven games in the first round, but were swept by the Orlando Magic in the second round. The Hawks had the second best team offensive rating in the NBA.

Key dates 
 June 25 – The 2009 NBA draft took place in New York City.
 July 8 – The free agency period started.

Draft picks

Roster

Pre-season 

|- style="text-align:center; background:#cfc;"
| 1 || October 7 || New Orleans Hornets || 108–102 || J. Teague (19) || M. West (11) || J. Smith (4)J. Johnson (4)M. Bibby (4) || 8,024 || 1–0 recap
|- style="text-align:center; background:#fcc;"
| 2 || October 11 || @Detroit Pistons || 91–100|| M. Williams (19) || A. Horford (7)J. Smith (7)O. Hunter (7) || J. Teague (8) || 18,167 || 1–1 recap
|- style="text-align:center; background:#cfc;"
| 3 || October 12 || Charlotte Bobcats || 107–90|| J. Teague (17) || A. Horford (6) || J. Teague (7) || 6,860 || 2–1 recap
|- style="text-align:center; background:#cfc;"
| 4 || October 14 || @Memphis Grizzlies || 111–96|| Maurice Evans (27) || A. Horford (5)R. Morris (5)O. Hunter (5) || J. Smith (4)M. Bibby (4)J. Teague (4) || 7,141 || 3–1 recap
|- style="text-align:center; background:#cfc;"
| 5 || October 19 || Washington Wizards || 113–95|| M. Williams (16)J. Teague (16) || M. Williams (6)A. Horford (6) || J. Crawford (9) || 8,754 || 4–1 recap
|- style="text-align:center; background:#cfc;"
| 6 || October 22 || @Miami Heat || 92–87|| J. Johnson (14) || A. Horford (10) || J. Johnson (8) || (Jacksonville, Florida)10,113 || 5–1 recap
|- style="text-align:center; background:#fcc;"
| 7 || October 23 || @Orlando Magic || 86–123 || J. Crawford (14) || J. Smith (6)A. Horford (6) || J. Teague (4) || 17,343 || 5–2 recap
|-

Regular season

Standings 

y – clinched division title
x – clinched playoff spot
e – eliminated from playoff contention

y – clinched division title
x – clinched playoff spot
e – eliminated from playoff contention

Record vs. opponents

Game log 

|- style="background:#cfc;"
| 1
| October 28
| Pacers
| 
| J. Johnson (25)
| A. Horford (16)
| J. Smith (8)
| Philips Arena17,998
| 1–0
|- style="background:#cfc;"
| 2
| October 30
| Wizards
| 
| J. Smith (20)
| A. Horford (12)
| M. Bibby (7)
| Philips Arena17,079
| 2–0

|- style="background:#fcc;"
| 3
| November 1
| @ Lakers
| 
| J. Johnson (9)
| J. Johnson, A. Horford (9)
| J. Smith (7)
| Staples Center18,997
| 2-1
|- style="background:#cfc;"
| 4
| November 3
| @ Trail Blazers
| 
| J. Crawford (27)
| A. Horford (13)
| J. Crawford (7)
| Rose Garden20,325
| 3-1
|- style="background:#cfc;"
| 5
| November 4
| @ Kings
| 
| J. Crawford (26)J. Johnson (26)
| J. Johnson (8)A. Horford (8)
| J. Crawford (4)J. Johnson (4)
| ARCO Arena11,751
| 4-1
|- style="background:#fcc;"
| 6
| November 6
| @ Bobcats
| 
| J. Crawford (13)J. Johnson (13)J. Smith (13)
| J. Smith (7)
| J. Teague (3)M. Bibby (3)
| Time Warner Cable Arena15,874
| 4-2
|- style="background:#cfc;"
| 7
| November 7
| Nuggets
| 
| J. Crawford (25)
| A. Horford (12)
| J. Smith (7)
| Philips Arena17,801
| 5-2
|- style="background:#cfc;"
| 8
| November 11
| @ Knicks
| 
| A. Horfod (25)
| J. Smith (12)
| M. Bibby (9)
| Madison Square Garden19,699
| 6-2
|- style="background:#cfc;"
| 9
| November 13
| @ Celtics
| 
| J. Johnson (24)
| A. Horford (13)
| M. Bibby (6)
| TD Garden18,624
| 7-2
|- style="background:#cfc;"
| 10
| November 14
| Hornets
| 
| J. Johnson (26)
| J. Smith (17)
| J. Johnson (7)
| Philips Arena18,572
| 8-2
|- style="background:#cfc;"
| 11
| November 16
| Trail Blazers
| 
| J. Johnson (35)
| J. Smith (16)
| J. Johnson (9)
| Philips Arena12,977
| 9-2
|- style="background:#cfc;"
| 12
| November 18
| Heat
| 
| J. Johnson (30)
| J. Smith (14)
| J. Smith (7)
| Philips Arena18,729
| 10-2
|- style="background:#cfc;"
| 13
| November 20
| Rockets
| 
| M. Williams (29)
| M. Williams (9)
| J. Johnson (9)
| Philips Arena16,674
| 11-2
|- style="background:#fcc;"
| 14
| November 21
| @ Hornets
| 
| J. Crawford (20)
| A. Horford (11)
| J. Smith (7)
| New Orleans Arena15,933
| 11-3
|- style="background:#fcc;"
| 15
| November 26
| Magic
| 
| J. Johnson (22)
| J. Smith (13)
| M. Bibby (5)
| Philips Arena19,193
| 11-4
|- style="background:#cfc;"
| 16
| November 27
| @ 76ers
| 
| J. Crawford (24)
| M. Williams (9)
| J. Crawford / M. Bibby (5)
| Wachovia Center12,984
| 12-4
|- style="background:#fcc;"
| 17
| November 29
| @ Pistons
| 
| J. Smith (23)
| A. Horford (10)
| M. Bibby (5)
| The Palace of Auburn Hills15,273
| 12-5

|- style="background:#cfc;"
| 18
| December 2
| Raptors
| 
| A. Horford (24)
| Z. Pachulia (8)
| J. Johnson (11)
| Philips Arena12,272
| 13-5
|- style="background:#fcc;"
| 19
| December 4
| Knicks
| 
| J. Johnson (29)
| A. Horford (14)
| J. Johnson (8)
| Philips Arena17,165
| 13-6
|- style="background:#cfc;"
| 20
| December 5
| @ Mavricks
| 
| J. Johnson (31)
| M. Williams (15)
| M. Bibby (6)
| American Airlines Center19,550
| 14-6
|- style="background:#cfc;"
| 21
| December 9
| Bulls
| 
| J. Crawford (29)
| M. Williams (8)
| J. Teague (8)
| Philips Arena16,808
| 15-6
|- style="background:#cfc;"
| 22
| December 11
| @ Raptors
| 
| J. Johnson (20)
| J. Smith (8)
| J. Teague (7)
| Air Canada Centre17,032
| 16-6
|- style="background:#cfc;"
| 23
| December 13
| Nets
| 
| M. Evans (22)
| M. Evans (9)A. Horford (9)
| J. Johnson (10)
| Philips Arena14,015
| 17-6
|- style="background:#cfc;"
| 24
| December 16
| Grizzlies
| 
| J. Johnson (26)
| A. Horford (10)
| J. Teague (6)
| Philips Arena13,013
| 18-6
|- style="background:#cfc;"
| 25
| December 18
| Jazz
| 
| J. Smith (16)
| J. Johnson (9)A. Horford (9)
| J. Johnson (7)
| Philips Arena17,501
| 19-6
|- style="background:#fcc;"
| 26
| December 19
| @ Bulls
|  OT
| J. Johnson (40)
| A. Horford (12)
| J. Johnson (4)M. Bibby (4)
| United Center21,381
| 19-7
|- style="background:#cfc;"
| 27
| December 22
| @ Timberwolves
| 
| J. Crawford (26)
| A. Horford (11)
| J. Johnson (6)M. Bibby (6)
| Target Center11,271
| 20-7
|- style="background:#fcc;"
| 28
| December 23
| @ Nuggets
| 
| J. Crawford (24)
| A. Horford (11)
| J. Johnson (9)
| Pepsi Center19,155
| 20-8
|- style="background:#cfc;"
| 29
| December 26
| @ Pacers
| 
| A. Horford (25)
| A. Horford (25)
| M. Bibby (8)
| Conseco Fieldhouse15,281
| 21-8
|- style="background:#fcc;"
| 30
| December 29
| Cavaliers
| 
| J. Crawford (26)
| A. Horford (9)
| M. Bibby (7)
| Philips Arena20,150
| 21-9
|- style="background:#fcc;"
| 31
| December 30
| @ Cavaliers
| 
| J. Johnson (35)
| A. Horford (7)M. Williams (7)
| M. Bibby (6)
| Quicken Loans Arena20,562
| 21-10

|- style="background:#fcc;"
| 32
| January 1
| Knicks
|  OT
| J. Johnson (35)
| A. Horford (19)
| M. Bibby (7)
| Philips Arena17,366
| 21-11
|- style="background:#fcc;"
| 33
| January 4
| @ Heat
| 
| J. Crawford (23)
| J. Johnson (6)A. Horford (6)J. Smith (6)
| J. Smith (5)
| American Airlines Arena16,500
| 21-12
|- style="background:#cfc;"
| 34
| January 6
| Nets
| 
| J. Crawford (29)
| A. Horford (10)
| J. Smith (7)
| Philips Arena11,219
| 22-12
|- style="background:#cfc;"
| 35
| January 8
| Celtics
| 
| J. Crawford (18)
| J. Smith (11)
| J. Johnson (8)
| Philips Arena15,149
| 23-12
|- style="background:#fcc;"
| 36
| January 9
| @ Magic
| 
| A Horford (14)
| J. Smith (7)
| J. Smith (3)J. Johnson (3)
| Amway Arena17,461
| 23-13
|- style="background:#cfc;"
| 37
| January 11
| @ Celtics
| 
| J. Johnson (36)
| A. Horford (12)
| J. Crawford (6)
| TD Garden18,624
| 24-13
|- style="background:#cfc;"
| 38
| January 13
| @ Wizards
| 
| J. Johnson (24)
| J. Smith (11)
| J. Smith (8)
| Verizon Center9,695
| 25-13
|- style="background:#cfc;"
| 39
| January 15
| Suns
| 
| A. Horford (24)
| J. Smith (15)
| M. Bibby (10)
| Philips Arena17,605
| 26-13
|- style="background:#fcc;"
| 40
| January 18
| Thunder
| 
| J. Johnson (23)
| J. Smith (12)
| J. Smith (7)
| Philips Arena 14,666
| 26-14
|- style="background:#cfc;"
| 41
| January 20
| Kings
| 
| J. Crawford (20)
| J. Smith (9)
| J. Johnson (7)
| Philips Arena14,809
| 27-14
|- style="background:#cfc;"
| 42
| January 22
| Bobcats
| 
| J. Crawford (24)
| A. Horford (9)
| J. Johnson (7)
| Philips Arena14,701
| 28-14
|- style="background:#cfc;"
| 43
| January 25
| @ Rockets
| 
| J. Smith (22)
| J. Smith (10)A. Horford (10)
| J. Johnson (4)
| Toyota Center14,998
| 29-14
|- style="background:#fcc;"
| 44
| January 27
| @ Spurs
| 
| J. Johnson (31)
| J. Smith (16)
| J. Smith (7)
| AT&T Center18,258
| 29-15
|- style="background:#cfc;"
| 45
| January 29
| Celtics
| 
| J. Crawford (28)
| J. Smith (9)
| J. Crawford (6)
| Philips Arena18732
| 30-15
|- style="background:#fcc;"
| 46
| January 30
| @ Magic
| 
|
|
|
| Amway Arena
| 30-16

|- style="background:#fcc;"
| 47
| February 2
| @ Thunder
| 
| J. Johnson (37)
| J. Smith (6)M. Williams (6)
| M. Bibby (6)
| Ford Center17,360
| 30-17
|- style="background:#cfc;"
| 48
| February 3
| Clippers
| 
| J. Johnson (34)
| A. Horford (10)J. Smith (10)M. Williams (10)
| J. Smith (6)
| Philips Arena13,303
| 31-17
|- style="background:#cfc;"
| 49
| February 5
| Bulls
| 
| J. Johnson (18) J. Smith (18)
| J. Smith (14)
| J. Smith (10)
| Philips Arena18,729
|32-17
|- style="background:#bbb;"
| 50
| February 6
| Wizards
| Postponed
|
|
|
| Philips Arena
|
|- style="background:#cfc;"
| 51
| February 9
| @ Grizzlies
| 
| J. Crawford (28)
| A. Horford (8)
| M. Bibby (6)
| FedExForum10,491
| 33-17
|- style="background:#fcc;"
| 52
| February 10
| Heat
| 
| J. Smith (18)
| A. Horford (10)
| M. Bibby (6)
| Philips Arena17,074
| 33-18
|- style="background:#cfc;"
| 53
| February 17
| @ Clippers
| 
| A Horford (31)
| J. Smith (9)
| J. Smith (7)
| Staples Center15,485
| 34-18
|- style="background:#fcc;"
| 54
| February 19
| @ Suns
| 
| J. Smith (21)
| J. Johnson (9)A. Horford (9)
| M. Bibby (4)
| US Airways Center18,266
| 34-19
|- style="background:#fcc;"
| 55
| February 21
| @ Warriors
| 
| J. Johnson (31)
| J. Smith (17)
| J. Smith (7)
| Oracle Arena17,822
| 34-20
|- style="background:#cfc;"
| 56
| February 22
| @ Jazz
| 
| J. Johnson (28)
| J. Smith (9)
| J. Johnson (6)
| EnergySolutions Arena19,911
| 35-20
|- style="background:#cfc;"
| 57
| February 24
| Timberwolves
| 
| J. Smith (27)
| A. Horfold (13)
| J. Johnson (5)A. Horford (5)J. Smith (5)
| Philips Arena15,059
| 36-20
|- style="background:#fcc;"
| 58
| February 26
| Mavericks
|  OT
| J. Johnson (27)
| J. Smith (11)
| J. Johnson (10)
| Philips Arena18,923
| 36-21
|- style="background:#cfc;"
| 59
| February 28
| Bucks
|  OT
| J. Johnson (24)
| J. Smith (15)
| J. Smith (6)
| Philips Arena16,381
| 37-21

|- style="background:#cfc;"
| 60
| March 1
| @ Bulls
| 
| J. Crawford (21)
| J. Smith (18)
| M. Williams (4)J. Smith (4)A. Horford (4)
| United Center19,011
| 38-21
|- style="background:#cfc;"
| 61
| March 3
| 76ers
| 
| M. Williams (21)
| M. Williams (8)A. Horford (8)J. Smith (8)
| J. Johnson (5)J. Smith (5)
| Philips Arena15,408
| 39-21
|- style="background:#cfc;"
| 62
| March 5
| Warriors
| 
| J. Smith (29)
| A. Horford (15)
| J. Johnson (8)
| Philips Arena14,066
| 40-21
|- style="background:#fcc;"
| 63
| March 6
| @ Heat
| 
| J. Crawford (24)
| A. Horford (9)
| J. Smith (5)
| American Airlines Arena19,600
| 40-22
|- style="background:#fcc;"
| 64
| March 8
| @ Knicks
| 
| J. Smith (25)
| A. Horford (12)
| J. Smith (6)
| Madison Square Garden19,763
| 40-23
|- style="background:#cfc;"
| 50
| March 11
| @ Wizards
| 
| J. Crawford (29)
| J. Johnson (7)
| J. Johnson (5)J. Smith (5)M. Bibby (5)
| Verizon Center13,625
| 41-23
|- style="background:#cfc;"
| 65
| March 13
| Pistons
| 
| J. Crawford (29)
| J. Johnson (7)
| J. Johnson (5)J. Smith (5)M. Bibby (5)
| Philips Arena18,214
| 42-23
|- style="background:#cfc;"
| 66
| March 16
| @ Nets
| 
| J. Crawford (25)
| A. Horford (11)
| A. Horford (7)
| Izod Center11,128
| 43-23
|- style="background:#fcc;"
| 67
| March 17
| @ Raptors
| 
| J. Crawford (33)
| A. Horford (14)
| J. Smith (7)
| Air Canada Centre18,441
| 43-24
|- style="background:#cfc;"
| 68
| March 19
| Bobcats
|  OT
| J. Johnson (18)J. Smith (18)
| M. Williams (14)
| J. Smith (5)
| Philips Arena17,697
| 44-24
|- style="background:#cfc;"
| 69
| March 21
| Spurs
|  OT
| M. Williams (26)
| A. Horford (18)
| J. Johnson (13)
| Philips Arena18,729
| 45-24
|- style="background:#fcc;"
| 70
| March 22
| @ Bucks
| 
| J. Johnson (27)
| A. Horford (12)
| A. Horford (4)
| Bradley Center14,186
| 45-25
|- style="background:#cfc;"
| 71
| March 24
| Magic
| 
| J. Johnson (17)
| A. Horford (11)
| J. Johnson (8)
| Philips Arena16,887
| 46-25
|- style="background:#fcc;"
| 72
| March 26
| @ 76ers
| 
| J. Johnson (20)J. Smith (20)
| A. Horford (10)
| J. Johnson (6)
| Wachovia Center 13,293
| 46-26
|- style="background:#cfc;"
| 73
| March 28
| Pacers
| 
| J. Smith (21)
| J. Smith (13)
| M. Bibby (8)
| Philips Arena16,646
| 47-26
|- style="background:#cfc;"
| 74
| March 31
| Lakers
| 
| J. Johnson (25)
| Z. Pachulia (10)
| J. Johnson (8)
| Philips Arena20,190
| 48-26

|- style="background:#fcc;"
| 75
| April 2
| @ Cavaliers
| 
| J. Smith (20)
| A. Horford (8)
| J. Johnson (5)
| Quicken Loans Arena20,562
| 48-27
|- style="background:#cfc;"
| 76
| April 3
| Pistons
| 
| J. Crawford (29)
| A. Horford (14)J. Smith (14)
| J. Crawford (6)
| Philips Arena18,729
| 49-27
|- style="background:#fcc;"
| 77
| April 6
| @ Bobcats
| 
| M. Evans (20)
| A. Horford (12)
| J. Teague (6)J. Crawford (6)
| Time Warner Cable Arena18,610
| 49-28
|- style="background:#fcc;"
| 78
| April 7
| @ Pistons
| 
| J. Crawford (19)
| A. Horford (12)
| A. Horford (6)
| The Palace of Auburn Hills22,076
| 49-29
|- style="background:#cfc;"
| 79
| April 9
| Raptors
| 
| J. Crawford (25)
| A. Horford (15)
| J. Johnson (7)
| Philips Arena19,382
| 50-29
|- style="background:#cfc;"
| 80
| April 10
| @ Wizards
| 
| J. Crawford (28)
| A. Horford (10)
| J. Smith (8)
| Verizon Center20,173
| 51-29
|- style="background:#cfc;"
| 81
| April 12
| @ Bucks
| 
| J. Johnson (31)
| A. Horford (12)
| Z. Pachulia (4)
| Bradley Center14,186
| 52-29
|- style="background:#cfc;"
| 82
| April 14
| Cavaliers
| 
| J. Teague (24)
| J. Smith (10)
| J. Teague (15)
| Philips Arena19,069
| 53-29

Playoffs

Game log 

|- style="background:#cfc;"
| 1
| April 17
| Milwaukee
| 
| J. Johnson (22)
| J. Smith (10)
| J. Johnson (5)
| Philips Arena18,729
| 1–0
|- style="background:#cfc;"
| 2
| April 20
| Milwaukee
| 
| J. Johnson (27)
| J. Smith (14)
| J. Smith (9)
| Philips Arena18,938
| 2–0
|- style="background:#fcc;"
| 3
| April 24
| @ Milwaukee
| 
| J. Johnson (25)
| J. Smith (12)
| J. Crawford (4)J. Johnson (4)
| Bradley Center18,717
| 2–1
|- style="background:#fcc;"
| 4
| April 26
| @ Milwaukee
| 
| J. Johnson (29)
| J. Smith (9)
| J. Johnson (9)
| Bradley Center18,717
| 2–2
|- style="background:#fcc;"
| 5
| April 28
| Milwaukee
| 
| A. Horford (25)
| A. Horford (25)
| J. Johnson (6)
| Philips Arena19,304
| 2–3
|- style="background:#cfc;"
| 6
| April 30
| @ Milwaukee
| 
| J. Crawford (24)
| A. Horford (15)
| J. Johnson (6)
| Bradley Center18,717
| 3–3
|- style="background:#cfc;"
| 7
| May 2
| Milwaukee
| 
| J. Crawford (22)
| A. Horford (15)
| J. Crawford (6)
| Philips Arena19,241
| 4–3

|- style="background:#fcc;"
| 1
| May 4
| @ Orlando
| 
| J. Smith (14)
| J. Johnson (7)Z. Pachulia (7)
| M. Bibby (3)J. Johnson (3)
| Amway Arena17,461
| 0–1
|- style="background:#fcc;"
| 2
| May 6
| @ Orlando
| 
| A. Horford (24)
| M. Williams (11)
| J. Johnson (5)
| Amway Arena17,461
| 0–2
|- style="background:#fcc;"
| 3
| May 8
| Orlando
| 
| J. Crawford (22)
| J. Smith (11)
| A. Horford (3)
| Philips Arena18,729
| 0–3
|- style="background:#fcc;"
| 4
| May 10
| Orlando
| 
| J. Crawford (18)
| J.Smith (8)
| J. Johnson (6)
| Philips Arena18,729
|0–4
|-

Player statistics

Season

Playoffs

Awards, records and milestones

Awards

Player of the Week 
 November 2–November 8 – Joe Johnson

Player of the Month

All-Star 
 Joe Johnson was selected to his fourth consecutive All-Star Game.
 Al Horford was selected to his first All-Star Game.

Season

Records

Milestones

Injuries and surgeries

Transactions

Trades 
On June 25, 2009 the Hawks traded guards Acie Law IV and Speedy Claxton to the Warriors for guard Jamal Crawford.

Signs 
On July 7, 2009 the Hawks re-signed veteran point guard Mike Bibby to a 3-year deal worth $18 million.

On July 8, 2009 the Hawks re-signed center Zaza Pachulia to a 4-year deal at $4.75 mil per year.

On August 14, 2009 the Hawks and unrestricted free agent forward Joe Smith agreed to terms on a 1-year contract at the veteran's minimum.

References 

Atlanta Hawks seasons
Atlanta
Atlanta Haw
Atlanta Haw